Meitei inscriptions are Meitei language inscriptions cut into stone slabs. They are a major source of information about the ancient history of the Meitei people and the kingdom of Kangleipak. They are mainly found in the hills as well as the plains of present-day Manipur. They were written using either the Meitei script or the Bengali script.

List of inscriptions

Konthoujam Lairembi stone relic

The site of Konthoujam Lairembi also hosts one of the most important archaeological treasures of not just Manipur but of the entire Indo-Burma region. Believed to be more than two thousand years old, a small stone with a width of two feet and length of three feet emerges from the ground. However, what is of austerity of this small relic is that it is being inscribed in Meitei script that is yet to be recognized though some language experts had claimed to have successfully deciphered it. Nevertheless, those who claimed to have read the scribbling had never revealed what is being written. On the other hand, a local of the village claimed that as of today, none of the language experts including members of a prominent Meitei language body have been unable to read the script citing the letters are not identified. The local also said legend has it that a man with white beards will someday appear, decipher the writings and will initiate a social change in this ancestral land of Manipur known to the medieval Burma as Cassay and Kathe to the Shans of Eastern Burma.

Another reported incident involving the stone relic concerns about the scripts getting blur when some students of Thoubal College got close towards it to see if they can actually read it. The fantastic claims remains just a narrative which has no rational explanation and hard to believe.

Monumental inscriptions of Gambhir Singh and Nara Singh

The stone edict of king Gambhir Singh was also found. The aged-old stone monumental inscriptions of Maharaj Gambhir Singh and Raja Nara Singh at the 1st Manipur Rifles complex, Haying Khongban in Imphal are now in a dilapidated condition and on the brink of collapse. Meanwhile, the State Archeology Department is waiting for the experts from the Archeological Survey of India to restore the historical monuments. The Manipur State Archeological Department has been protecting both the monuments since 1980. In the past, when Manipur was an independent kingdom, Manipuri soldiers used to pray and seek blessings from the sacred monuments before going to wars. Both of the original inscriptions are intact, but have begun to fracture on the back side. Gambhir Singh's inscription was made in 1928 and that of Nar Singh in 1843.

Pamheiba Stone Inscription of Bangai Range

In a rare discovery which is one of its kinds in the History of Manipur, a stone inscription was discovered at the present day Bangai Range in the interior hill area of Pherzawl district, near the confluence of Tuivai and Barak River. The later was known as Gwai River by the Manipuris.

The uniqueness of this inscription lies in the fact that the stone provides illustration of weapons and several equipments used in warfare. This is perhaps the sole inscription which provides crucial clues of the weapons employed by the troops of medieval Manipur, thereby assuming tremendous importance in the study of the ancient past.

According to some decipherable section of the stone which faces eastern direction, it was raised by King Pamheiba in the early 18th century. The inscription though written in Meitei script includes certain words associated with Hinduism. Unfortunately, centuries of negligence, several portions have been damaged and continue to be in the process of degeneration, according to archaeologist Mutua Bahadur.

Located at some 295 km from capital Imphal, in modern-day Bangai range, the inscription measures 58 X 56 cm.

It was during the reign of King Pamheiba that the erstwhile Manipuri kingdom reached the zenith of her power and engaged in numerous battles against the then Tripuri kingdom and the vast Burmese Empire for which Manipur had to endure severe repercussion after the demise of Pamheiba.
A drawing of Kohima Stone by Sir James Johnstone, of Pamheiba's stone inscription which was discovered at top of Bangai Range, illustration showed several weapons used by the then Manipuri troops which supposedly composed of ethnic Meitei and its hill based ethnic groups.

Prof. Gangmumei Kabui in his History of Manipur states that at least 10000 hill tribes were part of Pamheiba's grand 30000 strong Manipuri troops that raided Burma. The Pamheiba inscription distinguishes itself from other rock edicts. The illustration showed pictures of spears, bows, elephants, horses, the dart weapon – Arambai and Nongmei Ashubi.

Manipur Royal Chronicle, Cheitharol Kumbaba, corroborates the narration of Pamheiba's inscription which was raised during his battle against the Tripuris known to Manipuris as Takhel. It stated that Pamheiba and his troops made their camp at this site to establish his authority in the interior area now located in Pherzawl district. The Royal Chronicle termed the Bangai Range as "Mangaitang Chingsang". It stated that Pamheiba in 1734 camped at this site in his victorious war against the Tripuris, as per Mutua Bahadur.

Four stones of Tarao Pal

Four stone inscriptions with the oldest one being dated to the reign of King Urakonthouba in the 6th century and the latest being to the period of King Gambhir Singh were discovered beginning 1974 in remote corners of then Chandel district near the Indo-Myanmar border.

One of the stone inscriptions at Tarao Pal dates back to King Kiyamba (1467-1508). Measuring 24.5X13 cm, the inscription in archaic Meitei script strongly instructs that stealing of animals and taking of slaves cannot be tolerated from the village and that the village serves as the Eastern guard of Manipur state. A temple was also built in its vicinity, as per one of the deciphered lines, as per Mutua Bahadur. While deciphering of the whole script is impossible due to degeneration, the deciphered statement was arrived from the four lines inscribed in the stone. It during the period of King Kiyamba that the Kabaw Valley was annexed to the kingdom of Manipur after a joint successful military expedition with the King Khekhomba of the ethnic Shan, known to as Pong to the Meeteis, following which Ningthi Turel or present day Chindwin River was established as the eastern political boundary of the erstwhile Manipur kingdom.

Another stone attributed to King Kiyamba with a width of 15 cm and a height of 14 cm, having 5 lines is also to be found in which it was declared that it was the decree of Godly king Kiyamba that slaves cannot be taken from Tarao Pal.

Maharaj Gambhir Singh stone inscription measures 22 cm in width and has a height of 20 cm. Written in archaic Meetei script, 7 lines are inscribed in the stone at Tarao Pal in Chandel district, of which some could not be deciphered.

Three stone inscriptions of Khoibu

Three stone inscriptions were also discovered in Khoibu village along the Indo-Myanmar border and assumes one of the most important archaeological evidences to prove that the erstwhile Manipur kingdom was not confined to Imphal valley. Located near the vicinity of Kabaw Valley, Khoibu is a small village situated in the hill route connecting Imphal and Burma.

Prof. Gangmumei Kabui says that the issuing of the first stone was attributed to King Sameirang and his brother Thamanglang in the 5th century and was inscribed in Meetei script. The script mentioned that the border village in Indo-Myanmar border village was protected by the two brothers. The second stone was issued by King Kiyamba in the 15th century. The inscription, written in archaic Meetei script has a width of 2"-9", a thickness of 3" and height of 3" 2". Free translation of the old Meetei language states that it was the decree of Godly king Kiyamba that the village of Khoibu was to be exempted from tributes and its inhabitants are not to be tortured. The Third Stone inscription has been attributed to the period of King Paikhomba who ruled in the 17th century. Of the deciphered 16 lines, the text maintains that Paikhomba raised the stone and that Khoibu village is the keeper of the deity under the decree of godly king Kiyamba. The village was also to be exempted from state duties, not to be tortured and from Lallup service. Nevertheless, presence of such archaeologically important rock edicts clearly establishes the authority of earlier rulers.

References

Bibliography
 https://www.taylorfrancis.com/chapters/old-stone-inscriptions-manipur-special-reference-konthoujam-lairemma-stone-inscription-ratna-mutum/e/10.4324/9781003132745-18
 http://ijikc.co.in/index.php/ijikc/article/view/745

Further reading
 https://www.fpsjreview.in/home/articles/211/mizo-historians-contest-authenticity-of-inscriptions-at-maharaja-chandrakirti-memorial-park-at-chibu-thumkhong

Sources
Archaeological Survey of India.(2004). Indian Archaeology, 1998-99(A Review). New Delhi, Govt. of India.
Devi L. Kunjeswori. Archaeology in Manipur.(2003). New Delhi, Rajesh Publications.
Mutua Bahadur. (2005). Illustrated Manuscripts of Manipur. Imphal, Mutua Museum.
Singh Moirangthem Imocha. (2002). "History of the Evolution of Manipuri Script." (Unpublished PhD Thesis), M.U.
Singh O. Kumar. (1997). Stone Age Archaeology of Manipur. Manipur, AIOAS.
Singh P. Gunindra. (1983). Manipuri Numismatics''. Imphal, Mutua Museum.

Meitei culture
Meitei script
Indian inscriptions